Fortezza di Civitella del Tronto (Italian for Fortress of Civitella del Tronto)  is a fortress in Civitella del Tronto, Province of Teramo (Abruzzo).

History

Architecture

Gallery

References

External links

Civitella del Tronto